Taira flavidorsalis is a spider species in the genus Taira. It is native to Japan. It was first described in 1964 as Amaurobius flavidorsalis.

References 

Amaurobiidae